Byte Size Life is the fourth studio album released by Omni Trio, the drum and bass moniker of English electronic music producer Robert Haigh. The album was released on 6 September 1999 through Moving Shadow on compact disc and a limited edition 4-disc vinyl box set.

Track listing

Release history

References

External links
 

1999 albums
Rob Haigh albums